Phyllis Ann Love (December 21, 1925 – October 30, 2011) was an American theater and television actress.

Early years
Love was born in Des Moines, Iowa. Her parents were Jack Love, who owned a food market, and Lois Love, who owned a cafe prior to marriage. Her schooling came at Perkins Elementary School, Callanan Junior High School, and Theodore Roosevelt High School in Des Moines. Beginning in 1948, she attended the Carnegie Institute of Technology in Pittsburgh for an unknown length of time.

Career
After moving to New York, Love joined the recently formed Actors Studio. Her debut on television came in the studio's Actors Studio series; her Broadway and big screen bows, the year after that, as, respectively, Julie Harris's understudy in the stage adaptation of Member of the Wedding, and, an uncredited performer in the film So Young So Bad.

Throughout the 1950s she acted in Broadway productions and the occasional film. Her Broadway credits include A Distant Bell (1959), Flowering Cherry (1959), The Egghead (1957), The Rose Tattoo (1950), and The Country Girl (1950). She won the Clarence Derwent Award in 1951 for her role in The Rose Tattoo. That role also brought her a Donaldson Award for Best Supporting Performance (Actress)for 1950–1951.

She played Mattie Birdwell in the film Friendly Persuasion (1956), and Dick Clark's pregnant wife in The Young Doctors (1961). On television, she appeared principally in guest roles from 1950 until her retirement in the early 1970s. Among her roles were two guest appearances on Perry Mason, both times as the defendant, as Ellen Carter in the 1962 episode "The Case of the Bogus Books", and the part of Minerva Doubleday in the 1964 episode "The Case of the Wooden Nickels". In 1961 she played Dot the waitress in season 4 episode 17 and 18 of Have Gun - Will Travel, and in 1962 she played Mrs. Lucas in the 3rd-season episode "Four O'Clock" in The Twilight Zone. In 1964 she played Jennifer May in the episode "Doctor's Wife" in the TV series Gunsmoke. In 1965 she played Lieutenant Jenkins in Season 1, Episode 19 "Faith, Hope and Sergeant Aronson" in the TV series 12 O'Clock High

For 15 years, Love was on the faculty at Morningside High School in Inglewood, California, teaching drama and English.

Personal life
Love and James Vincent McGee were married for 30 years, from 1948 until they divorced in 1978. On January 22, 1983, Love married Alan Paul Gooding. They remained married until her death in 2011.

Death
On October 30, 2011, Love died at her home in Menifee, California, at age 85.

Filmography

References

External links
 
 
 
Phyllis Love at the University of Wisconsin's Actors Studio audio collection

1925 births
2011 deaths
20th-century American actresses
20th-century American educators
21st-century American actresses

Actresses from Inglewood, California
American film actresses
American stage actresses
American television actresses
Carnegie Mellon University College of Fine Arts alumni
Clarence Derwent Award winners
Donaldson Award winners
Drama teachers
Schoolteachers from Iowa
20th-century American women educators
Actresses from Des Moines, Iowa
People from Menifee, California
Theodore Roosevelt High School (Iowa) alumni